Gabrielle "Gabby" Sinclair (born 12 July 1993) is an Australian netball player in the Suncorp Super Netball league, playing for the Collingwood Magpies.

Career
Sinclair was a training partner at the Magpies in 2017 and 2018 and in that time played for the club's reserves team, the Tasmanian Magpies, where she was a key attacking figure in their premiership success in 2018. The Magpies elevated Sinclair to the senior list ahead of the 2019 season and re-signed her at the end of the season for another year.

References

External links
 Magpies Netball profile
 Suncorp Super Netball profile
 Netball Draft Central profile

Australian netball players
Collingwood Magpies Netball players
Living people
1993 births
Suncorp Super Netball players
Victorian Netball League players
Australian Netball League players
Tasmanian Magpies players